The 29th edition of the Vuelta Ciclista de Chile was held from May 4 to May 14, 2006.

Stages

2006-05-04: Coquimbo — Coquimbo (2 km)

2006-05-05: Coquimbo — La Serena (120 km)

2006-05-06: La Serena — Ovalle (110 km)

2006-05-07: La Ligua — San Esteban (182.5 km)

2006-05-08: Villa Alemana — Valparaíso (150 km)

2006-05-08: Valparaíso — Patrimonio de la Humanidad (57.4 km)

2006-05-09: Valparaíso — Algarrobo (107 km)

2006-05-10: Santiago — Sewell (160 km)

2006-05-11: Rancagua — Pichilemu (170 km)

2006-05-12: Paredones — Paredones (16 km)

2006-05-12: Paredones — Curicó (170 km)

2006-05-13: Curicó — Talca (120 km)

2006-05-14: Santiago — Santiago (60 km)

Final classification

References 
 cycle-racing
 cyclingnews

Vuelta Ciclista de Chile
Chile
Vuelta Ciclista
May 2006 sports events in South America